Bangladesh–Iraq relations refer to the bilateral relations between Bangladesh and Iraq. Bangladesh has an embassy in Baghdad. Iraq has an embassy in Dhaka.

History
After the Independence of Bangladesh in 1971, Iraq recognized Bangladesh as a sovereign country on 8 July 1972, becoming the first Arab country to do so. Bangladesh provided soldiers for patrolling the Iran–Iraq border in the aftermath of the Iran–Iraq War as part of the United Nations Iran–Iraq Military Observer Group. Bangladesh Army was part of the coalition in Operation Desert Storm that liberated Kuwait from Iraq.

Bangladesh's Expatriates Welfare and Overseas Employment Minister Khandaker Mosharraf Hossain and Iraq's Labour and Social Affairs Minister Nassar-Al-Rubaiee signed an Memorundam of Understanding to import labour from Bangladesh in 2009. Iraq has a resident embassy in Bangladesh. Bangladesh has expressed support for the territorial integrity of Iraq in 2008.

Economic relations
Bangladesh has sent migrant workers to Iraq, before the Second Gulf War but stopped after the war. In 2009 Bangladesh started to send workers to Iraq again. Bangladeshi workers in Iraq have faced harassment and violence from both security forces and rebels. As of 2016, 43 thousand Bangladeshis are employed in Iraq.

See also 
 Foreign relations of Bangladesh 
 Foreign relations of Iraq

References

Further reading
 

 
Iraq
Bilateral relations of Iraq